9 Story USA (formerly Out of the Blue Enterprises) is an American children's television production company based in New York City, founded by the co-creator of the Nickelodeon preschool live action/animated series Blue's Clues (hence the company's name) Angela C. Santomero and fellow ex-Nickelodeon executive Samantha Freeman Alpert.  The company served as the producers (with DHX Media's Decode Entertainment unit) of the computer-animated children's television series Super Why! that airs on most PBS stations and on CBC Kids in Canada and Blue's Room which formerly aired on Nick Jr. Out of the Blue, along with WQED, Fred Rogers Productions, and 9 Story Media Group, also produces a Flash-animated spin-off of Mister Rogers' Neighborhood, entitled Daniel Tiger's Neighborhood, which debuted on PBS Kids affiliates on September 3, 2012. It also produced Wishenpoof! and Creative Galaxy with Amazon Studios for Amazon Video. 

On January 12, 2018, 9 Story Media Group bought Out of the Blue Enterprises. It is now a wholly owned subsidiary.

Filmography

References

External links

Television production companies of the United States
American companies established in 2005
Entertainment companies established in 2005
Mass media companies established in 2005
2018 mergers and acquisitions